Li Jie (李誡; 1065–1110) was a Chinese architect and writer of the Song dynasty. He wrote the Yingzao Fashi.

References

External links 
 Yingzao Fashi: Twelfth-Century Chinese Building Manual by Qinghua Guo

Song dynasty writers
11th-century Chinese architects
1065 births
1110 deaths
Writers from Zhengzhou
Chinese non-fiction writers